Joshua Tenkorang (born 26 May 2000) is an Italian professional footballer of Ghanaian descent who plays as a midfielder for  club Virtus Entella, on loan from Cremonese.

Club career 
Born in Novara to Ghanaian parents, Tenkorang started playing football at grassroots club Santa Rita, before joining the youth teams of Novara, Pro Vercelli and Arminia Bielefeld. At the start of 2016, he joined local side Romentinese, where he subsequently made his debut for the senior team, aged sixteen, in the national sixth tier. During the following season, Tenkorang remained in the squad, as Romentinese officially formed a new club with fifth tier side Cerano.

In the summer of 2018, Tenkorang joined Serie D side Lanusei, where he registered twenty-six appearances and two goals, as the team missed out on promotion, after losing the play-off final against Avellino.

On 30 July 2019, Tenkorang joined fellow Serie D club Campobasso. Here, he spent two more seasons in the national fourth tier, as the team eventually won promotion to Serie C at the end of the 2020-21 campaign.

After being retained by Campobasso for the 2021-22 season, on 26 September 2021 Tenkorang scored his first professional goal in the home league match against Fidelis Andria. However, the action that led to his goal was immediately criticized by the visitors, as they expected to regain possession of the ball after the match was interrupted due to an injury. As an act of fair play towards the opponents, Campobasso's manager Mirko Cudini urged his team to let Fidelis Andria players score a goal, so they could restore their lead. The visitors eventually gained a 1-3 win. Tenkorang finished his first professional season with six goals and four assists in 32 matches, helping Campobasso stay in the third tier.

On 22 June 2022, Tenkorang joined Cremonese on a permanent deal, with the club having just sealed promotion back to Serie A after 26 years. On 24 August, Tenkorang was loaned out to Serie C side Virtus Entella.

Personal life 
Tenkorang has a twin brother, James, who is also a footballer; they played together in the same teams until 2019.

He gained his diploma at the liceo "Alessandro Antonelli" in Novara.

References

External links 
 
 
 

2000 births
Living people
People from Novara
Italian footballers
Italian people of Ghanaian descent
Association football midfielders
S.S.D. Città di Campobasso players
U.S. Cremonese players
Virtus Entella players
Serie C players